Connecticut Passion was an American women's soccer team, founded in 2007. The team was a member of the United Soccer Leagues W-League, the second tier of women's soccer in the United States and Canada. The team plays in the Northeast Division of the Eastern Conference. The team folded after the 2009 season.

The team played its home games at Sage Park in the town of Berlin, Connecticut. The team's colors was sky blue, black and gold.

Players

Squad 2015

Year-by-year

Coaches
  Dave Clarke 2008–2009

Stadia
 Sage Park, Berlin, Connecticut 2008-2009
 Reese Stadium, New Haven, Connecticut 2008 (3 games)
 Stadium at Pomperaug High School, Southbury, Connecticut 2008 (1 game)

External links
 Connecticut Football Club

  

Women's soccer clubs in the United States
Soccer clubs in Connecticut
Defunct USL W-League (1995–2015) teams
2007 establishments in Connecticut
2009 disestablishments in Connecticut
Association football clubs established in 2007
Association football clubs disestablished in 2009
Women's sports in Connecticut